The 2019–20 NC State Wolfpack women's basketball team represented North Carolina State University during the 2019–20 NCAA Division I women's basketball season. The Wolfpack were led by seventh-year head coach Wes Moore and played their home games at Reynolds Coliseum as members of the Atlantic Coast Conference.

They finished the season 27–4, 14–4 in ACC play to finish in second place. They advanced to the finals of the ACC women's tournament where they defeated Florida State to win the ACC Tournament for the first time since 1991. As winners of the conference tournament, the Wolfpack received the automatic bid to the 2020 NCAA Division I women's basketball tournament, however due to concerns with the COVID-19 pandemic, the NCAA Tournament was canceled on March 12, 2020.

Previous season
They finished the 2018–19 season 28–6, 11–5 in ACC play to finish in a tie for third place. They advanced to the semifinals of the ACC women's tournament where they lost to Louisville. They received an at-large bid to the NCAA women's tournament where they defeated Maine and Kentucky in the first and second rounds before losing to Iowa in the sweet sixteen.

Off-season

Recruiting Class

Source:

Roster

Schedule

Source

|-
!colspan=9 style="background:#E00000; color:white;"| Exhibition

|-
!colspan=9 style="background:#E00000; color:white;"| Non-conference regular season

|-
!colspan=9 style="background:#E00000; color:white;"| Conference regular season

|-
!colspan=9 style="background:#E00000; color:white;"| ACC Women's Tournament

Rankings

Coaches did not release a Week 2 poll and AP does not release a final poll.  Due to the cancellation of the NCAA Tournament, the coaches poll did not release a final ranking.

References

NC State Wolfpack women's basketball seasons
NC State